Eevi Huttunen, married name Pirinen (23 August 1922 – 3 December 2015), was a speed skater from Finland. She was born in Karttula.

For a decade she was almost the only female skater able to compete against the Soviet ladies on the longer distances, Huttunen made a comeback specially for the 1960 Winter Olympics (the first where women speed skaters were allowed to compete), where she won the bronze on the 3000 m. She competed in eleven World Allround Championships which was till 1960 the only international speed skating event for women, from 1948 to 1960 (every year except 1956 and 1958), winning the 1951 event and being on many occasions the best non-soviet skater, certainly in the longer distances.

Medals
An overview of medals won by Huttunen at important championships she participated in, listing the years in which she won each:

Personal records

References

Notes

Bibliography

 Eng, Trond. All Time International Championships, Complete Results 1889 - 2002. Askim, Norway: WSSSA Skøytenytt, 2002.
 Eng, Trond. Finland - Suomi: Speedskating as at 2009. Part 1: History/Records/Championships men junior. Askim, Norway: WSSSA Skøytenytt, 2009.
 Eng, Trond. Finland - Suomi: Speedskating as at 2009. Part 3: Championships ladies/Alltime lists ladies distances. Askim, Norway: WSSSA Skøytenytt, 2009.
 Teigen, Magne. Komplette resultater, Internasjonale Mesterskap 1889-1989 (in Norwegian). Veggli, Norway: WSSSA Skøytenytt, 1989.

External links
Eevi Huttunen on www.fanbase.com
Eevi Huttunen's obituary 

1922 births
2015 deaths
People from Karttula
Finnish female speed skaters
Medalists at the 1960 Winter Olympics
Olympic bronze medalists for Finland
Olympic medalists in speed skating
Olympic speed skaters of Finland
Speed skaters at the 1960 Winter Olympics
World Allround Speed Skating Championships medalists
Sportspeople from North Savo